Buckfast Tonic Wine is a caffeinated alcoholic drink consisting of pure caffeine added to fortified wine, originally made by monks at Buckfast Abbey in Devon, England, now made under a licence granted by the monastery, and distributed by  J. Chandler & Company in Great Britain, James E McCabe Ltd in Northern Ireland, and Richmond Marketing Ltd in Ireland. It is based on a traditional recipe from France. The wine's distributor reported record sales of £43.2 million as of March 2017.

Despite being marketed as a tonic, Buckfast has become notorious in some parts of Scotland and Northern Ireland for its association with ned culture and antisocial behaviour. High retail sales are recorded in Lurgan, as well as throughout the Central Lowlands including Glasgow and the surrounding areas of East Kilbride, Hamilton, Blantyre, South Lanarkshire, Cambuslang, and Coatbridge.

History

The wine, which is still manufactured using many of the same ingredients, is based on a traditional recipe from France. The Benedictine monks at Buckfast Abbey first made the tonic wine in the 1890s. It was originally sold in small quantities as a medicine using the slogan "Three small glasses a day, for good health and lively blood".

In 1927, the Abbey lost its licence to sell wine. As a result, the Abbot allowed wine merchants to distribute on behalf of the Abbey. At the same time, the recipe was changed to be less of a patent medicine and more of a medicated wine.

The wine, which comes in distinct brands depending on the market, has achieved popularity in working class, student, and bohemian communities in the United Kingdom and Ireland. In the Republic of Ireland, Buckfast is packaged in a darker bottle, has a slightly lower alcoholic strength, and lacks the vanillin flavouring present in the British version. Buckfast sold in Northern Ireland (where it has been nicknamed "Lurgan champagne") is the same as that sold in the rest of the UK.

Versions
Buckfast contains 15% alcohol in the 750 ml green-bottled UK version, and 14.8% in the brown-bottled Republic of Ireland version, which equates to roughly 11.25 UK units of alcohol.

Both versions of the drink contain phosphate and glycerophosphate (each of these as the sodium and/or potassium salt).

The "brown bottle" Buckfast sold in Ireland has a caffeine content about equal to a strong espresso coffee (60 mg/100 ml) and higher than Red Bull (32 mg/100 ml) whereas the UK-sold "green bottle" Buckfast has a caffeine content about equal to strong black tea (30 mg/100 ml).

Buckfast Tonic Wine (brown bottle)
Sold exclusively within the Republic of Ireland.

 Fortified wine, 14.8% alcohol
 Sodium and potassium glycerophosphates – both measured at 0.65% w/v
 Disodium phosphate
 Caffeine – 0.055% w/v
 Sulphite preservatives

Buckfast Tonic Wine (green bottle)
Sold in the United Kingdom.

 Fortified wine based aperitif, 15% v/v.
 Sodium glycerophosphate, an emulsifier.
 Dipotassium phosphate, a protein stabiliser
 Disodium phosphate, a stabiliser and emulsifier.
 Caffeine,  0.0375%w/v
 Vanillin

Antisocial image

In certain parts of Scotland, Buckfast is associated with drinkers who are prone to committing anti-social behaviour when drunk, especially drinkers under 18 years old. The drink also has a very high caffeine content, with each 750 ml bottle containing the equivalent of eight cans of cola. It has been suggested that this may cause it to act as a stimulant at the same time as removing inhibitions, self-control and a feeling of having drunk enough, though research into similar drinks have failed to find clear evidence for the latter effect. A diet of four bottles a day has been described as 'not conducive to a long life' in a Scottish court.

The beverage has entered the popular lexicon with nicknames such as "Wreck the Hoose Juice", "Commotion Lotion", "Cumbernauld Rocket Fuel", "Mrs. Brown", "Buckie Baracas", "Coatbridge Table Wine", and a bottle of "what the hell are you looking at?" It has also earned the unofficial slogan, "Buckfast: gets you fucked fast". The drink's prominence within the "Buckfast/Buckie Triangle" – an area east of Glasgow between Airdrie, Coatbridge and Bellshill – has raised concern. In addition, the glass bottle has been blamed for allegedly contributing to litter and providing drunkards with a weapon.

Several Scottish politicians and social activists have singled out Buckfast Tonic Wine as being particularly responsible for crime, disorder, and general social deprivation in these communities. Although Buckfast accounts for only 0.5% of alcohol sales in Scotland, the figure is markedly higher in Lanarkshire. There have been numerous calls for the drink to be banned (either throughout the country or in certain areas or shops), made more expensive to dissuade people from buying the product, or sold in plastic bottles to reduce glassing incidents. Helen Liddell, former Secretary of State for Scotland, called for the wine to be banned. In 2005, Scottish Justice Minister Cathy Jamieson suggested that retailers should stop selling the wine. On a subsequent visit to Auchinleck within her constituency, she was greeted by teenagers chanting, "Don't ban Buckie". All of these initiatives have been countered by lawyers acting for Buckfast distributors, J. Chandler & Company, in Andover. A further consequence was that Buckfast sales increased substantially in the months following Jamieson's comments.

In September 2006, Andy Kerr, the Scottish Executive's Health Minister, described the drink as "an irresponsible drink in its own right" and a contributor to anti-social behaviour. The distributors denied the claims and accused him of showing "bad manners" and a "complete lack of judgement" regarding the drink. Kerr met with J. Chandler & Company to discuss ways of lessening Buckfast's impact on west Scotland but the talks broke up without agreement. Three months later, Jack McConnell, First Minister of Scotland, stated that Buckfast had become "a badge of pride amongst those who are involved in antisocial behaviour." In response the distributors accused the Scottish Executive of trying to avoid having to deal with the consequences of failed social policy and the actual individuals involved in antisocial behaviour by blaming it on the drinks industry."

In January 2010, a BBC investigation revealed that Buckfast had been mentioned in 5,638 crime reports in the Strathclyde area of Scotland from 2006 to 2009, equating to an average of three per day.  In 2017, Scottish Police reported there had been 6,500 crimes related to the drink in the previous two years. One in 10 of those offences had been violent and 114 times in that period a Buckfast bottle was used as a weapon.
A survey at a Scottish young offenders' institution showed of the 117 people who drank alcohol before committing their crimes, 43 per cent said they had drunk Buckfast. In another study of litter around a typical council estate in Scotland, 35 per cent of the items identified as rubbish were Buckfast bottles.

In 2016 a sheriff said there was a "very definite association between Buckfast and violence" while sentencing a man for hitting a 15-year-old boy over the head with a bottle at a birthday party. In January 2018, a trial at the High Court in Edinburgh heard a man had consumed lager and a whole bottle of Buckfast before ferociously stabbing a workmate.

In July 2017, the British trade magazine The Grocer reported that increased sales of Buckfast in southeast England had pushed the drink up to 91 on UK's top 100 alcoholic brands. The increased sales were following a marketing campaign to improve the drink's image.

In 2017, thousands of empty Buckfast bottles were recovered during a clean-up of the Eglinton Canal in Galway, Ireland.

Manufacturer's response
The monks of Buckfast Abbey and their distribution partner, J. Chandler & Company, deny that their product is harmful, saying that it is responsibly and legally enjoyed by the great majority of purchasers. They also point out that the areas identified with its acute misuse have been economically deprived for decades and Buckfast represents less than one per cent of the total alcohol sales across Scotland. Abbot of Buckfast Abbey, David Charlesworth, has said that the tonic wine his monastery produces "is not made to be abused".

In February 2013, J. Chandler & Company applied to the Court of Session in Edinburgh to stop Strathclyde Police from marking bottles of Buckfast so they could trace where under-age drinkers bought them. A company spokesman complained, "This is discrimination at the highest level. Buckfast is no more involved in crime than any other brand of alcohol". A former head of the Scottish Police Federation said: "Buckfast, the distributors and the lawyers who act on behalf of the monks refuse, point blank, to take any responsibility for the antisocial behaviour that's caused by the distribution and the consumption of Buckfast. They even refuse to change the glass bottles to plastic bottles despite overwhelming evidence that large areas in play parks and certain areas in Scotland are littered with this green glass".

In February 2014, the case was settled without any judgment being made by the court. Assistant Chief Constable Wayne Mawson of Police Scotland apologised to J. Chandler & Co for asking a shopkeeper to stop selling Buckfast and gave written undertakings not to include the product in any bottle-marking scheme unless it has "reasonable grounds" for doing so, and "not to request licensed retailers, situated anywhere in Scotland, to cease stocking for sale Buckfast Tonic Wine". In 2016 sales of Buckfast Tonic Wine reached record yearly profits of £8.8 million. The abbey trust, which is a shareholder of the Hampshire-based wine's distributor and seller, J Chandler, gets a royalty fee for every bottle sold. Although the trust declined to give out specific sales figures, it said it "strives to work with J Chandler and Co to ensure that the tonic wine is marketed and distributed responsibly".

Buckfast Day
In 2015, a "National Buckfast Day" was set up by fans to honour the tonic wine. The organisers designated the second Saturday of each May National Buckfast Day. The organisers decided to rename the day World Buckfast Day for 2016. By its third year, several celebratory events were held on different continents around the world.

See also
 Ban on caffeinated alcoholic beverages, a list of bans on similar products
 Flavored fortified wines
 Parish ale, a British tradition of beer production by the church
 Vin Mariani, a wine fortified with cocaine endorsed by Pope Leo XIII

References

External links

 

1880 establishments in England
Alcopops
Caffeinated alcoholic drinks
Cocktails with wine
Companies based in Devon
English wine
Food and drink companies established in 1880
Fortified wine
Patent medicines